This is an alphabetical list of cricketers who have played for Sunrisers since their founding in 2020. They first played in the Rachael Heyhoe Flint Trophy, a 50 over competition that began in 2020. In 2021, the Twenty20 Charlotte Edwards Cup was added to the women's domestic structure in England.

Players' names are followed by the years in which they were active as a Sunrisers player. Seasons given are first and last seasons; the player did not necessarily play in all the intervening seasons. Current players are shown as active to the latest season in which they played for the club. This list only includes players who appeared in at least one match for Sunrisers; players who were named in the team's squad for a season but did not play a match are not included.

B 
 Hayley Brown (2020)

C
 Amara Carr (2020–2022)
 Kelly Castle (2020–2022)
 Kate Coppack (2021–2022)

D
 Naomi Dattani (2020–2022)

G
 Jo Gardner (2020–2022)
 Gayatri Gole (2020–2022)
 Jodi Grewcock (2022)
 Cordelia Griffith (2020–2022)

H
 Scarlett Hughes (2022)

M
 Alice Macleod (2020–2022)
 Abtaha Maqsood (2022)
 Katie Midwood (2020–2021)
 Florence Miller (2021–2022)

O
 Jessica Olorenshaw (2022)

P
 Sonali Patel (2020–2022)

R
 Mia Rogers (2020–2022)

S
 Grace Scrivens (2020–2022)
 Katherine Speed (2021–2022)

T
 Emily Thorpe (2020–2021)

V
 Mady Villiers (2020–2022)

W
 Fran Wilson (2020–2021)
 Katie Wolfe (2020–2021)
 Emily Woodhouse (2021)

Captains

References

Sunrisers (women's cricket)